Jesper Boqvist (born 30 October 1998) is a Swedish professional ice hockey centre for the  New Jersey Devils of the National Hockey League (NHL). Boqvist was selected 36th overall by the Devils in the 2017 NHL Entry Draft.

Playing career
Boqvist made his Swedish Hockey League debut playing with Brynäs IF during the 2015–16 SHL season. On 16 May 2017, Boqvist agreed to extend his contract with Brynäs IF for a further two seasons through to 2019. Boqvist was drafted 36th overall, in the second round of the 2017 NHL Entry Draft, by the New Jersey Devils.

On 10 June 2019, Boqvist signed a three-year, entry-level contract with the New Jersey Devils. Boqvist scored his first NHL career goal in a 3–2 loss against the Minnesota Wild on 26 November 2019. Boqvist's goal, which tied the game 1–1 in the first period, caused controversy by the play of Wayne Simmonds. The Wild used its coach's challenge for the play, but the goal was allowed to stand. The NHL then issued a statement during the third period that the goal should not been allowed.

On 22 July 2022, Boqvist agreed to his qualifying offer with the Devils, re-signing to a one-year, two-way contract for the 2022–23 season.

Personal life
Boqvist's younger brother Adam Boqvist is a defenceman for the Columbus Blue Jackets.

Career statistics

Regular season and playoffs

International

References

External links
 

1998 births
Living people
Binghamton Devils players
Brynäs IF players
New Jersey Devils draft picks
New Jersey Devils players
People from Falun
Sportspeople from Dalarna County
Swedish ice hockey centres
Timrå IK players
Utica Comets players